Skin Deep may refer to:

Film
 Skin Deep (1922 film), a film by Lambert Hillyer
 Skin Deep (1929 film), a film by Ray Enright
 Skin Deep (1983 film), a film by Chris Langman and Mark Joffe
 Skin Deep (1989 film), a film by Blake Edwards
 Skin Deep (1995 film), a film by Midi Onodera
 Skin Deep (2015 film), a film by Jonnie Leahy with Billie Rose Prichard

Television episodes
 "Skin Deep" (General Hospital: Night Shift)
 "Skin Deep" (Grimm)
 "Skin Deep" (House)
 "Skin Deep" (Law & Order)
 "Skin Deep" (Once Upon a Time)
 "Skin Deep" (The Outer Limits)

Music
 Skin Deep (Louis Bellson album) (1955)
 "Skin Deep", a composition by Louie Bellson
 Skin Deep (Buddy Guy album) (2008)
 Skin Deep (Solé album) (1999)
 "Skin Deep" (Cher song)
 "Skin Deep" (The Stranglers song)
 "Skin Deep", a song by Area-7 from Bitter & Twisted
 "Skin Deep", a 1994 song by Guns n' Wankers from For Dancing and Listening
 Skin Deep, a 2009 opera composed by David Sawer with a libretto by Armando Iannucci

Books
 Skin Deep. The Truth About Beauty Aids – Safe and Harmful, a 1934 book by M. C. Phillips
 Skin Deep, a 1992 graphic novel by Charles Burns
 Skin Deep, a 1996 novel by Lois Ruby
 Skin Deep: Inside the World of Black Fashion Models, a 1998 non-fiction book by Barbara Summers
Skin Deep: Journeys in the Divisive Science of Race, 2019 non-fiction book by Gavin Evans.

Other uses 
 Skin Deep (cosmetics database)
 Skin Deep (webcomic), a webcomic by Kory Bing
 Skin Deep (video game), an upcoming video game by Blendo Games

See also
 Skin depth, in electronics